Maskare is a village in the municipality of Varvarin, Serbia. According to the 2002 census, the village has a population of  539 people.

Notable people
Jovan Janićijević Burduš, Serbian actor was born in this village

References

Populated places in Rasina District